Max H. Homer (May 20, 1935 – October 30, 2014) was a Democratic member of the Pennsylvania House of Representatives.

He was convicted of extortion under color of official right in August 1975.

Homer went to Thiel College, received his master's degree from Duquesne University and his doctorate degree from West Virginia University. He then taught high school and was a school district superintendent. Homer died on October 30, 2014.

References

1935 births
2014 deaths
People from Stowe Township, Allegheny County, Pennsylvania
Democratic Party members of the Pennsylvania House of Representatives
Educators from Pennsylvania
Thiel College alumni
Duquesne University alumni
West Virginia University alumni
Politicians convicted of extortion under color of official right
Pennsylvania politicians convicted of crimes